is a railway station in the city of Yurihonjō, Akita Prefecture,  Japan, operated by JR East.

Lines

Station layout
The station has two opposed side platforms connected by a footbridge.  One of side platforms was originally an island platform, but one side is no longer in use. The station is staffed.

Platforms

History
Ugo-Iwaya Station opened on October 16, 1922 as a station on the Japanese Government Railways (JGR) Rikuusai Line. It was switched to the control of the JGR Uetsu Main Line on April 20, 1924. The JGR became the JNR (Japan National Railway) after World War II. With the privatization of the JNR on April 1, 1987, the station came under the control of the East Japan Railway Company. A new station building was completed on March 8, 2000. The building also includes offices for the Chamber of Commerce of the former town of Ōuchi, Akita.

Passenger statistics
In fiscal 2018, the station was used by an average of 142 passengers daily (boarding passengers only).

Surrounding area

See also
List of railway stations in Japan

References

External links

 JR East Station information 

Railway stations in Japan opened in 1922
Railway stations in Akita Prefecture
Uetsu Main Line
Yurihonjō